Bellis pappulosa is a species of daisy in the genus Bellis. This species is native in Western Europe, Algeria, France, Morocco and Spain.

References 

pappulosa